Gol Banu Rural District is a rural district (dehestan) in Pain Jam District, Torbat-e Jam County, Razavi Khorasan Province, Iran. At the 2006 census, its population was 7,998, in 1,614 families.  The rural district has 15 villages.

References 

Rural Districts of Razavi Khorasan Province
Torbat-e Jam County